George Wilberforce Kakoma (27 July 1923 – 8 April 2012) was a Ugandan musician who wrote and composed "The Pearl of Africa", Uganda's national anthem. Kakoma's composition was first played publicly by the Police Band conducted by Mr. Moon on October 9, 1962 during Uganda's Independence Day Celebrations. He received a personal token of sh2,000 from the Prime Minister Dr. Milton Obote for his work.

Early life and education
Kakoma was born in 1923 to Semu Kyasooka Kakoma, a Gombolola Chief and Solome Mboolanyi Kakoma in what is now Wakiso District Uganda's Mengo town council. He attended Mengo Primary School and later King's College Budo, where he was a brother-in-law and a contemporary of Sir Edward Mutesa II. He was an active choir member and a keen sportsman during his school days. He studied Music at the Royal Conservatory of Music in Nairobi and later at the Royal College of Music in London, before pursuing further studies at the University of Durham in Northern England. He graduated from the Trinity College of Music and Durham University.

George Wilberforce Kakoma is survived by his children, grandchildren and great grandchildren.

1.Andrew Robson -

2. Sarah Ntudde

 - Eddissa
 - Samuel
 - Kaggwa
 - Elina
 - Yunia
 - Esther 
 - Lukoda (deceased)

3. Barbara Nababinge

 - Ronnie
 - Jackie
 - Ian (deceased)
 - Irene

4. Nassuna Margaret(Deceased)

 - George 
 - Goretti
 - Mwagale
 - Jordan

5. James Kagye -

6. Semu Kakoma -

7. Paul Lwanga Kakoma 
 - Jonathan 
 - Beth

8. Sanyu Kakoma-

9. Christopher Mbalire Kakoma

 - Patrick 
 - Leni
 - Allan
 - Andrisha

10.Maggie Kulabako

 - Chris
 - David  
 - Paul

11. George Kakoma

 - Andrew
 - Aaron
 - Andrea
 - Ariel

12.Robert Kyasoka Kakoma-

13.Christine Nabisenke

 - May
 - Psalm
 - Shalom
 - Able

14.Maryanne Nansubuga

 - Tricia
 - Gonza
 - Joel
 - Mercy

Career

Prior to Uganda's independence, three sub-committees were established to deal with creating Uganda's national symbols. The sub-committee for the creation of a national anthem encouraged Ugandans to submit their proposals.

"The compositions had to be short, original, solemn, praising and looking forward to the future. They had to be harmonised in the usual four parts-soprano, alto, tenor and bass," said Kakoma in an interview.

In July 1962, the committee chose Kakoma's composition. It had taken him a day to compose the music and write the lyrics for "Oh Uganda, Land of Beauty".

Kakoma worked as a music teacher in the Masaka District.

Awards 
Kakoma is a recipient of numerous awards, including the National Independence Medal in 2010. Apart from the National Anthem, he contributed to the composition of the East African Community Anthem in 2005. He also composed the Uganda Wildlife Authority anthem.

Later life and death
Kakoma died on Easter, April 8, 2012 in Kampala's Kololo suburb, aged 89. He had been ill since February 2011.

Publications
 George W. Kakoma, Songs from Buganda, Univ. of London Press, London 1969,

References

External links 
 Article in New Vision
 Listen to "Oh Uganda, Land of Beauty" (instrumental version) on BBC Uganda country profile

1923 births
2012 deaths
Alumni of Durham University
Alumni of Trinity College of Music
National anthem writers
Ugandan composers